The name Pakhar has been used to name three tropical cyclones in the Western Pacific Ocean. It refers to the Irrawaddy dolphin and was submitted by Laos.

Tropical Storm Pakhar (2012) (T1201, 02W) – struck Vietnam.
Tropical Storm Pakhar (2017) (T1714, 16W, Jolina) – made landfall on Luzon and later in South China.
Tropical Storm Pakhar (2022) (T2225, 29W, Rosal) – remained out at sea

Pacific typhoon set index articles